Laura Zimmermann (born 5 April 2003) is a Swiss ice hockey player and member of the Swiss national ice hockey team. She is currently playing college ice hockey in the Western Collegiate Hockey Association (WCHA) conference of the NCAA Division I with the St. Cloud State Huskies.

Zimmermann represented Switzerland at the 2021 IIHF Women's World Championship. As a player with the Swiss national under-18 team, she participated in the IIHF Women's U18 World Championships in 2019 and 2020.

References

External links
 

Living people
2003 births
Swiss women's ice hockey forwards
Olympic ice hockey players of Switzerland
Ice hockey players at the 2022 Winter Olympics